Malcolm John Frankian (April 3, 1905 – April 14, 1963) was an American football end in the National Football League for the Boston Redskins and the New York Giants.  He also played and coached in the second American Football League, the third American Football League and the Pacific Coast Professional Football League for the Los Angeles Bulldogs.

Prior to his professional career, Frankian attended Saint Mary's College of California.

He died in Dos Palos, California.

References

External links

1905 births
1963 deaths
Saint Mary's Gaels football players
American football wide receivers
Boston Redskins players
Players of American football from Worcester, Massachusetts
New York Giants players